Urmas Tartes is an Estonian biologist and nature photographer.

Life and work
Tartes ended his studies in Nõo Secondary school in 1982 with a gold medal and graduated from University of Tartu in 1989 with cum laude as biologist-zoologist. He became Doctor of Philosophy in 1995 with a thesis "Respiration Rhythms in Insects".

Since 1989 he worked in Estonian Institute of Zoology and Botany. Between 1996 and 2004 he served as the director of the institute. Between 2005 and 2010 he was a professor in Estonian University of Life Sciences. From then on, he continued as a freelance nature photographer and writer.

Awards 
He was the recipient of the Fourth Class of Order of the White Star in 2001.

In 2009 he won Veolia Environnement Wildlife Photographer of the Year in the category "Animals in their Environment" with a photo of a springtail on a snowflake.

Books co-authored by Tartes 
 Bioloogia gümnaasiumile (part III), Eesti Loodusfoto. 2001. .
 Legendiloomad, Varrak. 2008. .
 Loodusfoto lugu ja lumm, Varrak. 2009. .
 Putukad õhus, maas ja vees, Valgus. 2012. .
 Eesti päevaliblikad, Varrak. 2014. .

Gallery

References

External links 

 

Nature photographers
Estonian photographers
Estonian biologists
Academic staff of the Estonian University of Life Sciences
Living people
University of Tartu alumni
People from Tartu
Recipients of the Order of the White Star, 4th Class
Estonian entomologists
Year of birth missing (living people)